How to Tell a Story and Other Essays (1897) is a series of essays by Mark Twain. In them, he describes his own writing style, attacks the idiocy of a fellow author, defends the virtue of a dead woman, and tries to protect ordinary citizens from insults by railroad conductors. The essays contained include How to Tell a Story, The Wounded Soldier, The Golden Arm, Mental Telegraphy Again, and The Invalid's Story.

References

External links

 
 
 

1897 books
Essay collections
Essays by Mark Twain
1897 essays
Harper & Brothers books